Periclepsis cinctana, the Dover twist, is a species of moth of the family Tortricidae found in Europe. It was first described by Michael Denis and Ignaz Schiffermüller in 1775.

Description
The wingspan is 13–17 mm. There are contrasting cream and brown markings on the forewings. Adults have been recorded on wing from late April to the beginning of July.

The larvae feed on Lotus, Anthyllis, Genista and Cytisus species from  within a tubular silken gallery. The species overwinters in the larval stage.

Distribution
It is found in most of Europe, where it has been recorded from Spain, Great Britain (Kent and Tiree), the Benelux, Germany, Denmark, Italy, Switzerland, Austria, the Czech Republic, Slovakia, Slovenia, Poland, Hungary, Bulgaria, Romania, North Macedonia, Norway, Sweden, the Baltic region and Russia.

The habitat consists of chalk downlands and calcareous grasslands.

References

Archipini
Moths described in 1775
Tortricidae of Europe
Taxa named by Michael Denis
Taxa named by Ignaz Schiffermüller